Alan Buchanan may refer to:

 Alan Buchanan (politician) (born 1952), Canadian university administrator and politician
 Alan Buchanan (bishop) (1907–1984), Anglican bishop
 Alan Buchanan (naval architect) (1922–2015), British naval architect and yachtsman

See also 
 Allan Buchanan (1916–1993), Australian rules footballer